Talleh Zang (also Romanized as Taleh Zang and Talleh Zang-e Pā'īn) is a village in Mazu Rural District, Alvar-e Garmsiri District, Andimeshk County, Khuzestan Province, Iran. At the 2006 census, its population was 540, in 104 families.

References 

Populated places in Andimeshk County